Grewia occidentalis, the crossberry, is a small, hardy, attractive tree indigenous to Southern Africa.

Description

A small, scrambling, deciduous tree reaching a height of about 3 m, its purple, star-shaped flowers appear in summer, followed by distinctive four-lobed berries (from where it gets its common names "crossberry" and "four-corner"). These shiny reddish-brown fruits remain on the tree for long periods and are favoured by fruit-eating birds. The simple leaves are shiny, deep green and sometimes slightly hairy.

Distribution and Habitat
Grewia occidentalis occurs naturally across south-eastern Africa, where its range extends from Cape Town along the coast to Mozambique and inland to Zimbabwe.

The native habitats of the plant are extremely varied, it is found in both the arid karoo of western South Africa and from the Highveld, and across the Afromontane forests of the Drakensberg range along the eastern coastline.

Growing Grewia occidentalis

This decorative garden plant tolerates both light frost and drought. It also grows in both full sun or shade. The root system is not aggressive and can therefore be planted near buildings and paving, and it is very good at attracting butterflies and birds to the garden.
The crossberry is best propagated from seed, although even then it can be erratic, as usually the seed needs to pass through the gut of a monkey before germination commences.

The berries are eaten locally, either fresh and raw, fermented with traditional beer, or used with goats milk to make berry yoghurt.

References

External links

 

occidentalis
Fruits originating in Africa
Afromontane flora
Flora of South Africa
Trees of South Africa
Plants described in 1753
Taxa named by Carl Linnaeus